John Clifford Moffet (born July 27, 1964) is an American former swimmer who competed at the 1984 Summer Olympics in Los Angeles, California, having also been selected for the 1980 Summer Olympics that were ultimately boycotted by the United States.  At the 1984 Olympics, he finished fifth in the final of the men's 100-meter breaststroke event. In 1985 he won three gold medals at both the Pan Pacific Swimming Championships and the Summer Universiade. In 1986, he concluded his collegiate career, after winning five NCAA Division 1 Championships, and moved into the entertainment industry. As a television producer he is a three-time Primetime Emmy Award winner for The Amazing Race.

Early life
Moffet was born in Banning, California. He took up swimming at the age of 11 at the Mount Baldy Swim Club, but moved to Newport Beach prior to starting high school, where he attended Newport Harbor High School. He joined the local Beach Swim Club and won a silver medal in the 200 metres breastroke at the 1980 United States Swimming National Championships. This led to his selection to represent the United States at the 1980 Summer Olympics in Moscow, but he was prevented from attending due to the country's boycott of the Games. In lieu of competing, the team was awarded the Congressional Gold Medal.

Swimming career
In 1981, Moffet set a national high school record of 55.24 in the 100 yards breaststroke and finished fourth in that event at the national championships, also taking bronze in the 200 metres breaststroke. The following year, he won bronze medals in both of those events at the 1982 World Aquatics Championships and began attending Stanford University. He also swam in the heats of the gold medal-winning 4×100 metres medley relay. He set a Pan American Games record in the qualifying rounds of the 100 metres breaststroke at the 1983 edition, but ultimately finished second to his compatriot Steve Lundquist. He competed in that event at the 1984 Summer Olympics and set an Olympic record of 1:02.16 in the heats, despite injuring his thigh muscle during the race. This injury led him to finish fifth in the final and not start in the 200 metres breaststroke, in which he was also entered. That same year, he won those events at the National Collegiate Athletic Association (NCAA) Championships and held the world record in the 100 metres breaststroke from June 25 until July 29.

In 1985, Moffet won gold medals in the 100 and 200 metres breaststroke events, as well as the 4×100 metres medley relay, at the Pan Pacific Swimming Championships, Summer Universiade, and NCAA Championships, the latter of which helped earn Stanford its first overall Division 1 swimming championship since 1967. The American team's Pan Pacific relay time set a world record that lasted until September 25, 1988. In his final year at Stanford, 1986, he helped the university capture a second consecutive NCAA Division 1 championship and took the 200 metres breaststroke title, giving him five NCAA Division titles overall. During his senior year, he received the NCAA's Today's Top VI Award (now Today's Top 10 Award) as one of the top six student athletes in the country. He was inducted into the Stanford Athletics Hall of Fame in 1998 and in 2016 was selected as part of the Pac-12 Conference Men's Swimming and Diving All-Century Team.

Later career
Upon graduation, Moffet elected to pursue a career in the entertainment industry and has produced television for multiple networks in the United States. Among his programming, he produced seven seasons of The Amazing Race, for which he won three Emmy Awards as supervising producer from 2005 through 2007.

Moffet has also remained active in the realm of sport. As of 2020, he was serving on the Los Angeles Sports Council Board of Directors, as President of the Southern California Olympians & Paralympians Association, and on the board of the Trident Swim Foundation. He was previously an advisor to the Los Angeles bid committee for the 2028 Summer Olympics.

See also
 List of Stanford University people
 List of World Aquatics Championships medalists in swimming (men)
 World record progression 100 metres breaststroke
 World record progression 4 × 100 metres medley relay

References

External links
John Moffet featured in the official film for the 1984 Summer Olympics

1964 births
Living people
American male breaststroke swimmers
World record setters in swimming
Olympic swimmers of the United States
People from Banning, California
Stanford Cardinal men's swimmers
Swimmers at the 1983 Pan American Games
Swimmers at the 1984 Summer Olympics
World Aquatics Championships medalists in swimming
Pan American Games silver medalists for the United States
Pan American Games medalists in swimming
Universiade medalists in swimming
Universiade gold medalists for the United States
Medalists at the 1985 Summer Universiade
Medalists at the 1983 Pan American Games
Emmy Award winners
Television producers from California